Richard Doyle, sometimes credited as Richard Doyal, is an American actor.

Early life 
At age six, Richard Doyle got his first taste of entertainment when a recreation director at a naval base in Norfolk, Virginia put him in front of a crowd of Navy wives; he sang "Oh, You Beautiful Doll".

His acting education included studies at Long Beach City College.

Career 
Doyle had an earlier role in the second season of Barnaby Jones; episode titled, "Blind Terror"(09/16/1973). He has appeared on such TV series as Cheers,  Voyage To The Bottom Of The Sea, Charlie's Angels, Dallas, M*A*S*H, Cannon, The Mod Squad, and worked with Ernest Borgnine on the science fiction series Future Cop.

Doyle has also acted in non-traditional films for the museum field. In 1984, coinciding with the 1984 Summer Olympics in Los Angeles, he performed in a special effects holographic show entitled "Wizard of Change," at the California Science Center, for the General Motors hosted exhibit "Wheels of Change," which following the Los Angeles Olympics was transferred to the Museum of Science and Industry in Chicago. The 3D illusion show, designed by award winning experience designer Bob Rogers and the design team BRC Imagination Arts, involved Doyle as a charming wizard character who explained that manufacturing was like magic that could transform base materials into modern miracles. Doyle worked again with Bob Rogers and BRC Imagination Arts in 2005 as he acted in the leading role for an educational 4D special effects film they produced for the Abraham Lincoln Presidential Library and Museum in Springfield, Illinois, "Lincoln's Eyes." In this educational film, presented on three screens with supporting dimensional sets and in-theater atmospheric special effects, Doyle played the role of an artist who narrates the show, and discusses how he came about exploring the subject of Abraham Lincoln through Lincoln's life events.

Beyond film, Doyle has earned much of his living as a voice actor, but says that he always preferred theatre work. He was a founding member of the South Coast Repertory theatre company.

Filmography

Film

Television

Animation

Video games

References 
 6. Demetria Fulton previewed Doyle in the second season of Barnaby Jones; episode titled, "Blind Terror"(09/16/1973).

External links

Living people
American male film actors
American male television actors
American male voice actors
Long Beach City College alumni
Year of birth missing (living people)